Matthew Keech (born 21 October 1970 in Hampstead, London) is a former English cricketer. Keech was a right-handed batsman and a right-arm medium pace bowler.

Prior to breaking into a county first team Keech represented England in eight Youth Test Matches and five Youth One Day Internationals. This was to be as far as his international career would progress.

Keech signed for his first club Middlesex in 1991, making his first-class debut against Cambridge University and his List-A debut against Surrey. Keech spent three seasons with the club before leaving at the end of the 1985 season.

Keech signed for Hampshire in 1994, where he would spend five years playing for. Keech played in 49 first-class matches and 74 one-day matches for the county. At the end of the 1999 season Keech left Hampshire. In 2001 he joined Dorset, playing in a single one-day match against Bedfordshire.

External links
Matthew Keech on Cricinfo
Michael Keech on CricketArchive
Matches and detailed statistics for Matthew Keech

1970 births
Living people
People from Hampstead
Cricketers from Greater London
English cricketers
Middlesex cricketers
Hampshire cricketers
Dorset cricketers